The Rovegnatta oil field is an oil field located in Lecco, Piedmont. It was discovered in 2000 and developed by Eni. It began production in 2000 and produces oil.

References

Oil fields in Italy